Black Panther is a 2018 American superhero film based on the Marvel Comics character of the same name. Produced by Marvel Studios and distributed by Walt Disney Studios Motion Pictures, it is the 18th film in the Marvel Cinematic Universe (MCU). The film is directed by Ryan Coogler, who co-wrote the screenplay with Joe Robert Cole, and stars Chadwick Boseman as T'Challa / Black Panther, alongside Michael B. Jordan, Lupita Nyong'o, Danai Gurira, Martin Freeman, Daniel Kaluuya, Letitia Wright, Winston Duke, Angela Bassett, Forest Whitaker, and Andy Serkis. In Black Panther, T'Challa is crowned king of Wakanda following his father's death, but his sovereignty is challenged by Killmonger (Jordan), who plans to abandon the country's isolationist policies and begin a global revolution.

Black Panther premiered in Los Angeles on January 29, 2018, and was released theatrically in the United States on February 16, 2018. The film has garnered numerous awards and nominations with most nominations recognizing the film itself, direction, screenplay, acting, action sequences, costume design, production values, and soundtrack. It was nominated for seven Academy Awards (winning three), one AACTA Award, one American Film Institute (won), one American Music Award (won), nine BET Awards (winning two), one Billboard Music Award, seventeen Black Reel Awards (winning ten), one British Academy Film Award (won), twelve Critics' Choice Movie Awards (winning three), three Golden Globe Awards, eight Grammy Awards (winning two), two Hollywood Film Awards (won), seven MTV Movie & TV Awards (winning four), one MTV Video Music Award (won), sixteen NAACP Image Awards (winning ten), one National Board of Review (won), five People's Choice Awards (winning two), one Producers Guild of America Award, eight Satellite Awards (winning two), two Screen Actors Guild Awards (winning both), fourteen Saturn Awards (winning five), eleven Teen Choice Awards (winning three), and one Writers Guild Award.

Black Panther was the first superhero film to receive a Best Picture nomination, and the first MCU film to win several categories.



Accolades

References

External links 
 

Accolades
Accolades
Black Panther
Marvel Cinematic Universe: Phase Three